Kalwaka is a town in the Soaw Department of Boulkiemdé Province in central western Burkina Faso. It has a population of 2,175.

References

Populated places in Boulkiemdé Province